Morten Hagen (born 6 August 1974) is a Norwegian professional golfer. His home club is Vestfold Golfklubb.

Hagen has spent most of his career playing in events on the various Scandinavian tours, where he has collected several victories and finished top of the Nordic League Ranking in 2005. He has also played many events over the course of six seasons on the second tier Challenge Tour, winning the Telia Challenge Waxholm in 2005. He has made just two appearances on the European Tour, the first in the 2005 Abama Open de Canarias and the second in 2006 at the OSIM Singapore Masters.

Amateur wins
1991 Norwegian Junior Championship
1993 Norwegian Amateur Open Championship
1994 Norwegian Amateur Youths Championship

Professional wins (7)

Challenge Tour wins (1)

Challenge Tour playoff record (1–0)

Nordic Golf League wins (4)

Swedish Golf Tour wins (1)

Other wins (1)
1997 Norwegian PGA Championship

Team appearances
Amateur
Eisenhower Trophy (representing Norway): 1994, 1996
European Amateur Team Championship (representing Norway): 1995

Professional
World Cup (representing Norway): 1997

External links

Morten Hagen at golferen.no 
Morten Hagen at golfdata.se 

Norwegian male golfers
European Tour golfers
Sportspeople from Tønsberg
1974 births
Living people